Katchafire are an all Māori New Zealand roots reggae band from Hamilton, New Zealand.

History
Katchafire formed in Hamilton in 1997, originally as a Bob Marley tribute band. The band's name derives from Catch A Fire, The Wailers' debut album. They have released six albums: Revival (2003), which featured the highest-selling New Zealand single of 2002 "Giddy Up", Slow Burning (2005)  Say What You're Thinking (2007), On the Road Again (2010), and the compilation Best So Far (2013) Legacy (2018).

The band has extensively toured Australia, the UK, Europe, the United States, New Caledonia, the Pacific Islands, Guam, Indonesia, Brazil including their home country of New Zealand and have played on the same bills as The Wailers, The Marley's, Steel Pulse, Third World, UB40, Shaggy, Lauryn Hill, Fiji, and Horace Andy to name a few.

Band members
The bands original line-up consisted of Founder Grenville Bell (Manager, Lead Guitar) with his two sons Logan (Vocals) Jordan (Drums), the line-up expanded to include eight members, including Jerry Taukamo (Lead Vocals, Lead Guitar), Thompson Hohepa (Lead Vocals), Hani Totorewa (Keyboards, Vocals), Bass duties went to a number of different musicians, Jhonny Fish (John Kennedy), Shocka ( Shane Maraki), Tere Ngarua and Travis Te Hau.

As a result of commitments with other bands, family and religion, lead singer Jerry departed from the band Katchafire with Logan stepping into the position becoming the band's new and current lead singer.

With the addition of James "Jamey" Ferguson (Vocals, Keyboard, Saxophone) and departure of Tere Ngarua opened opportunity for Ara Adams Tamatea (Bass, Band Management) and Leonard "Leon" Davey (Percussion, Vocals) not long after which allowed Grenville Bell to step out of the Management duties and continue his role as the bands Lead Guitarist and the brand "Katchafire" was realized.

The band went through yet another change in line-up as Ara stepped down from his role as manager/bass player continuing only as the bands New Zealand booking agent, with original bass player Tere Ngarua returning and Logan taking over the band management.

The current line-up:

Logan Bell (Guitar, Vocals) 1997 - present
Jordan Bell (Drums, Vocals) 1997 - present
Leonard "Leon" Davey (Percussion, Vocals). 2000 - present
Tere Ngarua (Bass) 1997 / 2007 - present
Roy Kaiki (Keyboards, Vocals) 2016 - present
Wiremu Barriball (Lead Guitar, Vocals) 2016 - present

Former Band Members:

Grenville Bell, (Lead Guitar) 1997 - 2014
Haani Totorewa (Keyboards, Guitar, Vocals) 1997 - 2013
James "Jamey" Ferguson (Keyboards, Saxophone, Vocals) 2000 - 2013
Ara Adams Tamatea (Bass) 2000 - 2006

Jerry Taukamo (Lead Vocals, Lead Guitar)
John "Jhonny fish" Kennedy (Bass)
Shane "Shocka" Maraki (Bass)
Travis Te Hau (Bass)

Discography

Albums

Featured appearances
Katchafire have appeared on a number of compilations since 2002 in New Zealand.  The following is a list of these albums that have featured tracks by  Katchafire.

Singles

Notes

References

External links

Official Facebook Page

Musical groups established in 2000
New Zealand reggae musical groups
Culture in Hamilton, New Zealand
Pacific reggae
Māori-language singers